is a train station located in Ogōri, Fukuoka.

Lines 
Nishi-Nippon Railroad
Tenjin Ōmuta Line

Platforms

Adjacent stations

Surrounding area

Downhill
 Ōhara Elementary School
 7-Eleven
 Aeon Ogōri Shopping Center
 Ogōri Sport Park
 Ogōri Athletics Field

Uphill
 JGSDF Ogōri Camp
 Nishihara Clinic
 Ōhara Junior High School
 Honma Hospital (5 minutes by car)
 Lawson Ogōri store
 Ogōriōho Post Office
 Hiraoka Cookery College
 Kyushu Institute of Information Sciences

Railway stations in Fukuoka Prefecture
Railway stations in Japan opened in 1924